Audley Hugh Harrison,  (born 26 October 1971) is a British former professional boxer who competed from 2001 to 2013. As an amateur he represented Great Britain at the 2000 Olympics, winning a gold medal in the super-heavyweight division and becoming the first ever British boxer to win Olympic gold in that division. Harrison turned professional the following year after signing a contract with BBC Sport, and went on to have seventeen fights on the network before their cancellation of all boxing broadcasts.

In his professional career he challenged for the WBA, British, and Commonwealth heavyweight titles. In 2009, Harrison won the Prizefighter tournament, his first of two. He became the European heavyweight champion in 2010, after defeating Michael Sprott in a rematch of their 2007 bout. In 2013, Harrison won his second Prizefighter tournament, becoming the first boxer to do so.

Amateur career
Boxing out of Repton Amateur Boxing Club in Bethnal Green, London, Harrison became British super heavyweight champion in 1997, defeating Nick Kendall in the final. He retained the title in 1998, defeating Dean Redmond, and won gold at the 1998 Commonwealth Games beating Michael Macquae of Mauritius in the final. In 2000 he won gold at the Sydney Olympics by defeating Mukhtarkhan Dildabekov of Kazakhstan on points.  After his medal win, Harrison was awarded an MBE.

Highlights
1998 at the European Super Heavyweight Championships in Minsk, Belarus, lost to Serguei Lyakhovich (Belarus)
1998 Commonwealth Games Super Heavyweight Gold Medalist. Results were:
Defeated Fai Falamoe (New Zealand) points
Defeated Jim Whitehead (Australia) KO 3
Defeated Michael Macquae (Mauritius) KO 1
1999 competed at the World Championships in Houston, United States. Results were:
Defeated Lazizbek Zokirov (Uzbekistan) points
Lost to Sinan Samil Sam (Turkey) points
Won the Super Heavyweight Gold Medal representing Great Britain at the 2000 Olympics in Sydney, Australia. Results were:
Defeated Alexei Lezin (Russia) TKO 4
Defeated Alexey Mazikin (Ukraine) points
Defeated Paolo Vidoz (Italy) points
Defeated Mukhtarkhan Dildabekov (Kazakhstan) points

Professional career
In 2001, Harrison released his autobiography Realising the Dream and set up his own company, A Force Promotions, to manage his career and concluded several high-profile sponsorships deals and became the first boxer in Britain to sign a direct broadcast deal.

He signed a £1 million deal with the BBC to show his first ten professional fights.

His debut was against US club fighter Michael Middleton, whom Harrison knocked out in the first round in Wembley Arena with 6 million viewers watching at home. He was then out of action for several months with an injury, but by the end of the year outpointed Briton Derek McCafferty over six rounds.

Harrison continued to win and made his United States debut in November 2002, knocking out Shawn Robinson in the 1st round.  In February 2003 he beat US fighter Rob Calloway in four rounds, and outpointed Ratko Draskovic over eight rounds. Harrison then knocked out Matt Ellis in two rounds. Harrison then tried to arrange a fight with 41-year-old ex-World champion Frank Bruno, who had been retired for seven years. A dispute at York Hall, Bethnal Green with the Herbie Hide after the Ellis fight resulted in a riot. The proposed Frank Bruno fight collapsed shortly afterwards, when Bruno was sectioned under the Mental Health Act. Harrison and Hide were both penalised by the British Boxing Board of Control for the riot.

America bound
Following the Ellis riot, Harrison relocated to the USA where he was unbeaten in 11 fights, with 8 knockouts. In the 2003 November issue of the Ring Magazine, Harrison was tipped to emulate Lennox Lewis and become a dominant world champion.

He had three more fights in 2003, against Lisandro Diaz (KO4), Quinn Navarre (KO3), and Brian Nix (KO3), in America. Harrison was sparring regularly with experienced world class Heavyweights like Vaughn Bean.

Harrison returned to the UK in 2004, but instead of fighting new British champion Michael Sprott for the British title, he fought unbeaten Dutch fighter Richel Hersisia for the World Boxing Foundation (WBFo) World belt. He knocked out Hersisia in 4 rounds. He defended the title twice: a 12-round points win over late-sub Julius Francis, and a 9th-round TKO of unbeaten Tomasz Bonin. After suffering a serious ligament tear in his left hand requiring hand surgery in New York, Harrison did not fight for almost a year.

BBC deal ends
Harrison's contract was not renewed in 2004 and the BBC stopped broadcasting professional boxing.

Harrison returned to the ring in June 2005, knocking out Robert Davis (KO7) and Robert Wiggins (KO4). On The Best Damn Sports Show Period he said he was now ready to step up and face world class opponents and get a title shot.

Loss of form
Harrison returned to the UK in December to face long-time bitter rival Danny Williams in London for the Commonwealth title. Harrison stepped in after Matt Skelton had pulled out and took the bout on five weeks notice. Harrison lost a close, split decision.

In April 2006, Harrison fought in the US against Dominick Guinn and again lost on points. Harrison put the defeat down to loss of confidence from his defeat to Williams and insisted he would bounce back. In June, he scored a three-round knockout of Andrew Greeley in an off-TV fight in America, and was poised for a fight with Matt Skelton to try to resurrect his career. Skelton had beaten Danny Williams in July, winning the title Williams had earlier taken from Harrison. When Skelton dropped out only one week before the fight due to injury, Danny Williams replaced him.

Williams had trained 8 weeks for a fight with British champion Scott Gammer. This time Harrison fought far more aggressively, decking Williams twice and winning on a third-round knockout. Williams suffered a broken nose and severe lacerations, and Harrison was once again lauded as a contender for a world title. Following the victory over Williams, Harrison signed a promotional deal with Frank Warren, whose aim was to get Harrison a world title fight in 2007.

On 17 February 2007, Harrison was knocked out by Michael Sprott for the European Union title. This third professional loss left Harrison's future uncertain. Harrison claimed that he could make a comeback, but Warren suggested that any return to the ring would be for a reduced purse, since the public would have no great interest.

Harrison returned to fight Paul King for a bout scheduled for 29 September 2007 in Sheffield. However, he and his coach Kelvyn Travis were involved in a car accident on 21 September 2007 in the United States, and Harrison suffered injuries that caused the fight to be cancelled. Harrison had also suggested that a deal would be announced involving promoter Dennis Hobson, but the cancellation of the fight meant that a formal announcement was on hold. Harrison underwent surgery for his injuries, and returned on 19 April 2008, beating the American Jason Barnett in the fifth round on the undercard of the Bernard Hopkins vs. Joe Calzaghe fight at the Thomas & Mack Center in Las Vegas, Nevada. This bout was the first of a new multi-bout agreement between Harrison and Warren, which aimed to get Harrison a world title shot in 2009.

After proposed matches with Samuel Peter and Martin Rogan fell through, on 6 September 2008 Harrison gained what the BBC described as "an unconvincing victory" over George Arias at the MEN Arena in Manchester. The fight was overshadowed by Amir Khan's first defeat later on the same card. On 6 December 2008, Harrison's career seemed all but over as he was defeated by the winner of the first Prizefighter tournament and Belfast taxi driver, Martin Rogan. The referee scored the contest 96–95 in favour of the Irishman.

Comeback
Harrison signed for the Prizefighter tournament, an eight-man, one-night knockout tournament that took place at ExCeL London on 2 October 2009. On 1 October 2009, he weighed in for Prizefighter at 18 stones and half a pound. He went on to win the tournament, by way of second round knock-out against Coleman Barrett. Before that, he had knocked out Scott Belshaw and won a unanimous decision over Danny Hughes. Following his success in the Prizefighter tournament, it was announced on 15 January 2010 that Harrison would face Albert Sosnowski for the European Boxing Union heavyweight title, with the fight set for 9 April 2010. However Sosnowski called the bout off for a shot at Vitali Klitschko's WBC title.

On 9 April 2010, Harrison won the vacant EBU belt against old foe Michael Sprott at Alexandra Palace. He knocked out Sprott in the final round despite being behind on all three judges scorecards. Harrison claimed he sustained a shoulder injury early in the fight and had to carry on single-handed. BBC Sport said of the fight: "Having come within seconds of a defeat that would have made a mockery of pre-fight assertions that he could face one of the Klitschko brothers for a world title, Harrison said: 'I had to win it somehow.

On 24 April 2010, Harrison underwent surgery in Cheadle, Greater Manchester to repair the torn Pectoralis major muscle. The surgeon said he expected Harrison to make a "full recovery in about 12 to 16 weeks".

World title challenge vs. David Haye
On 8 June 2010, Harrison vacated his European title, announcing his intention of getting a world title shot. He began negotiations with Hayemaker Promotions soon after, which culminated in a world-title fight in the M.E.N. Arena against WBA champion David Haye on 13 November 2010.

Harrison was defeated by Haye, with the fight being stopped in the third round after Harrison was unable to respond to a barrage of punches from Haye. Statistics from the fight showed that Harrison only landed a single punch in the entire duration of the contest.

Harrison was heavily criticised for his performance after the bout. British and Commonwealth champion Derek Chisora stated, "I'd never show my face again if I fought like that. It was pathetic. He disgraced himself and he disgraced British heavyweights, he shouldn't get paid the reported million pounds he is earning after that shambles." European light-heavyweight champion Nathan Cleverly also voiced his discontent with the fight, adding Harrison should now retire. Due to the nature of Harrison's defeat, the BBBofC withheld some of the fighter's purse while a full investigation of the bout was carried out. After the investigation into the fight was concluded, Harrison was granted his full purse on 11 January 2011.

After defeat by David Haye through to retirement
On 3 December 2010, it was confirmed Harrison would continue his career as a professional boxer despite calls for him to retire. Former British and Commonwealth champion Derek Chisora was critical of the decision, stating, "He's going to box on, but who's going to buy the tickets to go and watch him? Even if he gives them to you for free are you going to go and watch? ... Good luck to Audley anyway."

On 15 November 2011, during an interview on BBC Breakfast following his departure from Strictly Come Dancing, Harrison announced that he would return to boxing for one last time saying "It could be over, but I just need to go and check." He stated his intention was to fight British Heavyweight Champion Tyson Fury in 2012.

Harrison returned to the ring on 26 May 2012 and boxed Ali Adams at the Brentwood Centre, Essex for the International Masters Championships. Harrison sent his opponent to the canvas with a right hand and although Adams managed to get to his feet, a flurry of follow-up shots from Harrison prompted the referee to step in and end the contest.

Harrison faced David Price on 13 October 2012, and lost the fight by knockout after 82 seconds of the first round.
Harrison announced that he would not retire from boxing and will box on.

On 23 February 2013 Harrison won the Prizefighter 29: The International Heavyweights III tournament, defeating Derric Rossy in the final.

On 27 April 2013, Harrison stepped into the ring to fight the unbeaten American prospect Deontay Wilder, who had a record of 27 wins, all knockouts [27–0–0]. Wilder had not been beyond 4 rounds in his professional career. The bout only lasted a mere 70 seconds of the first round. Wilder landed a right hand which wobbled Harrison, Wilder then rushed in with a flurry of wild punches. Harrison was knocked down but managed to beat the count. However, the referee then stopped the bout, deeming Harrison unable to continue. Wilder won via TKO, his 28th consecutive knockout.

On 1 May 2013, Harrison announced his retirement from boxing. However just 20 days later, he came out of retirement with intentions to box on.

On 26 March 2014, Harrison announced he was no longer a professional boxer, and would not return to the ring.

Professional boxing record

Television viewership

Germany

UK pay-per-view bouts

Reality television
On 6 September 2011, it was announced that Harrison would take part in the 2011 series of Strictly Come Dancing. Harrison and his dance partner Natalie Lowe made it to the seventh round of the contest before being voted out.

Harrison came second in the 2014 Summer edition of Celebrity Big Brother, and in 2016 he took part in Celebrity MasterChef.

Personal life
Harrison is married to Raychel. They have a daughter called Ariella Amore Harrison, and a son named Hudson, who was born in May 2013.

In 2015 Harrison revealed he was suffering from traumatic brain injuries leading to sight problems and severe mood swings.

References

External links

English male boxers
Heavyweight boxers
Super-heavyweight boxers
Boxers at the 2000 Summer Olympics
Boxers at the 1998 Commonwealth Games
Olympic boxers of Great Britain
Olympic gold medallists for Great Britain
Alumni of Brunel University London
People from Bethnal Green
1971 births
Living people
Black British sportsmen
English people of Jamaican descent
English Olympic medallists
Commonwealth Games gold medallists for England
Prizefighter contestants
England Boxing champions
Olympic medalists in boxing
Medalists at the 2000 Summer Olympics
European Boxing Union champions
Commonwealth Boxing Council champions
Commonwealth Games medallists in boxing
Boxers from Greater London
People with traumatic brain injuries
Alumni of The College of Haringey, Enfield and North East London
Medallists at the 1998 Commonwealth Games